Moodie is a station on Ottawa, Ontario, Canada's transitway served by OC Transpo buses. It is located in the western transitway section near the interchange of Moodie Drive and Highway 417 near Crystal Beach. The station opened on December 24, 2017 as a bus rapid transit (BRT) station, with later plans to convert it to light rail transit (LRT).

Service

The following routes serve Moodie station as of October 6 2019:

References

Railway stations scheduled to open in 2026
2017 establishments in Ontario
Transitway (Ottawa) stations